Bowmanella dokdonensis  is a Gram-negative, rod-shaped, exoelectrogenic and motile bacterium from the genus of Bowmanella which has been isolated from seawater from the Liancourt Rocks.

References 

Alteromonadales
Bacteria described in 2015